South Punjab Forest Company (SPFC) is a subsidiary of the Forestry, Wildlife & Fisheries Department, Government of the Punjab and operates on Public Private Partnership (PPP) mode. The company is created under the visionary leadership of Mian Muhammad Shahbaz Sharif, Chief Minister Punjab and spearheaded by Awais Ahmed Khan Leghari, Chairman, South Punjab Forest Company (SPFC).  One of the main objectives of the organization is to streamline public and private sector investments in the forestry sector, so that deforestation can be reduced in Punjab, and forest conservation and sustainable economic development go hand in hand. SPFC aims to encourage investments in the forestry sector which offers low risk with high return. The land will be awarded to successful bidders for 15 years and further extendable to another 15 years subjected to satisfactory performance of investors. The project will be floated in the market for solicitation of expression of interest from the potential investors in June 2017. The land slots will be awarded to the successful bidders based on evaluation by the end of August, 2017. The Monitoring and Evaluation (M&E) of forest sites, awarded to successful bidders, will be done in collaboration with the Forestry, Wildlife & Fisheries Department, Government of the Punjab, as per the provisions of PPP Act, 2014, and The Punjab Forest (Amendment) Act, 2016. Revenue sharing will be done in this initiative.
The Company in order to effectively reach out to the business community is organizing seminars in collaboration with various Chambers of Commerce & Industry to sensitize business groups to invest in the opportunity.

Governance
The company is overseen by Board of Directors consisting of nine members nominated by Government of Punjab

Areas
SPFC owns 134,995 acres of land in districts of Bahawalnagar, Bahwalpur, Dera Ghazi Khan, Muzaffargarh, Rahim Yar Khan and Rajanpur. The details of each region can be found in following tables.

Bahawalnagar

Bahawalpur

Dera Ghazi Khan

Muzaffargarh

Rahim Yar Khan

Rajanpur

References

External links
 Official website of South Punjab Forest Company
 Forestry, Wildlife & Fisheries Department, Government of the Punjab

South Punjab Forest Company 

Departments of Government of Punjab, Pakistan
Forestry in Pakistan